Rimantė Šalaševičiūtė (born 25 February 1954, in Varniai, Soviet Union) is a Lithuanian politician and lawyer, ombudsman, and political and public figure.

Biography
From 1971 to 1976, Šalaševičiūtė studied at the Vilnius University Faculty of Law. She taught at many different universities before becoming a politician.

From 1990 to 1995, she was the Vilnius City Council Secretariat Secretary-consultant. From 1995 to 2003, she was a Seimas ombudsman advisor, and from 2003 to 2005, she was a  Seimas Ombudsman herself. She was also a Lithuanian national UNICEF board member. She was a member of the Seimas from 2012 to 2016, and, from 2014 to 2016, in the government of Algirdas Butkevičius, the Minister of Health of Lithuania. From 2001 onward, she is a member of the Lithuanian Social Democratic Party. In February 2016, however, she stepped down from both the Seimas and as the Minister of Health after she publicly admitted to giving a bribe to a doctor.

References

1954 births
People from Rietavas Municipality
Women government ministers of Lithuania
Ombudsmen
Communist Party of Lithuania politicians
Democratic Labour Party of Lithuania politicians
Social Democratic Party of Lithuania politicians
Living people
Health ministers of Lithuania
Women members of the Seimas
21st-century Lithuanian politicians
21st-century Lithuanian women politicians
Members of the Seimas